Li Fu Lee (born May 3, 1904) was a Chinese engineer and teacher known for being the first Chinese woman to attend the Massachusetts Institute of Technology (MIT). Her attendance starting in 1925 caused a sensation. It was reported by The Boston Globe and other newspapers across the US, as well as Popular Science Monthly and MIT's The Technology Review. She was noted for being a Chinese female student and for majoring in electrical engineering, which the undergraduate students at the time said was the most difficult major according to The Boston Globe. She was one of the 25 women who graduated from MIT in 1929 and one of the first women to earn a Bachelor of Science in electrical engineering at MIT.

Biography 

Li Fu Lee was born on May 3, 1904 in Changdong, Hebei. She was Han Chinese and married Kuan Tung, who was from a prominent Manchu family. She earned a Bachelor of Science from the National Technical School of China. By 1925, she lived in Beijing.

In 1925, Kuan was studying electrical engineering at the Massachusetts Institute of Technology (MIT). During his study, he decided to want Lee to study at MIT as well. Kuan returned to China with this in mind. Soon after Lee and Kuan had their wedding and honeymoon, in September, they moved to the US. They boarded the President McKinley from Shanghai to Seattle. Soon after they arrived, that same year, Lee enrolled at MIT in electrical engineering. Lee and Kuan both graduated from MIT with a Bachelor of Science in electrical engineering in 1929 and 1927 respectively. She reportedly lived with Kuan at 21 Lee St. in Cambridge.

Lee's attendance at MIT was sensational. The Boston Globe reported on it and published a photo of her on October 20, 1925. It declared her as MIT's "most interesting student" that year, saying: "Dressed in her quaint and Oriental costume, Mrs Tung makes an unusual sight in the corridors of the institute." Other newspapers across the US reported on the story as well.

Lee was noted for being a Chinese female student. In 1925, Chinese Students' Monthly said that she "is perhaps the first Chinese girl student studying engineering in this country that we know of." In February 1926, Popular Science Monthly published a piece about her. It symbolized Lee's attendance as progress for women's rights in China, saying: "At least there is one Chinese [Kuan Tung] who believes that  should have a place outside the home as well as in." That same month, The Technology Review of MIT reran the photo of Lee first published in The Boston Globe and noted that she was "the first Chinese Co-ed ever to enter [MIT]".

Lee was also noted for studying electrical engineering at MIT, which was considered to be particularly challenging at the time. Chinese Students' Monthly said that "certainly it is epoch-making that she should choose 'the toughest course' in the long noted 'tough' institution." The Boston Globe said that "[t]he electrical engineering course she is taking is regarded as the hardest course at the institute by all the undergraduates." It reported that the male students at MIT noted that she was "registered in a course that is harder ... than 99 percent of coeds ever think of taking." She took classes in physics, which The Boston Globe reported as "one of the hardest subjects taught at [MIT]."

The Boston Globe said that Lee was dedicated to her studies. She had "all the appearance of a hard and industrious worker" and was "very ambitious to obtain her degree". She paid "strict attention" in class, recording "nearly everything the instructors sa[id]" in her notebook. She always completed homework on time.

In September 1925, soon after enrolling at MIT, Lee was elected as the chairman of the social committee in the MIT Chinese Students' Club. Lee was the first and, at the time, the only woman to be in the club. The Boston Globe said that she "made a decided hit with" the female students at MIT. They helped improve Lee's knowledge of the English language. She reportedly studied at home and did the housework for Kuan. Kuan was apparently a devoted husband; he walked her to and from class daily, holding her bag. Lee was said to be particularly interested in electrical communications.

Little is known about Lee's career after graduating from MIT. Lee returned to China, where she became an engineer and taught at university. She raised a family with Kuan in China. After the Chinese Communist Revolution, she and her family fled to Taiwan, where she earned a government position. She and her family then returned to the US.

Chowdhury (2022) said that during a time which lacked female role models, family support may have been crucial for many of the earliest women's success in engineering, including that of Lee. Despite possibly not having a role model, a supportive family along with academic talents gave her strength.

Legacy 
Lee was the only known Chinese woman who studied at MIT from 1877 to 1931. She was one of the 25 women who graduated in 1929. She was one of the first women to earn a Bachelor of Science in electrical engineering at MIT. She was part of an exhibition commemorating the 140th anniversary of the enrollment of the first Chinese student at MIT in 1877 called China Comes to Tech: 1877–1931. It was shown at MIT's Maihaugen Gallery from February 2017 to March 2018. The website China Comes to MIT, a supplement to the exhibition, has an article on her saying that she "was a pioneer among women, not only in China, but in the US as well." Chowdhury (2022) noted that although women studying science and engineering became commonplace in China and the lack of female role models may no longer be an issue, "the story of [Lee] remains relevant as an example of how it all began."

See also 
Li Minhua – became the first woman to earn a PhD in mechanical engineering from MIT in 1948

Notes

References

Works cited

External links 
1925: The First Chinese Woman Student at MIT
Chinese women engineers
Chinese women educators
Massachusetts Institute of Technology alumni
1904 births
Year of death missing